Thuluva Vellalar (Thondamandala Tuluva Vellalar),  also known as Agamudaya Mudaliars   and Arcot Mudaliars,  is a caste found in northern Tamil Nadu, southern Andhra Pradesh and southern Karnataka, India. They were originally significant landowners.

Etymology

The term Vellalar may be derived from the word Vellam meaning water (flood), denoting their ability to control and store water for irrigation purposes. Since they migrated from the Tulu country, they are called Thuluva Vellalar.

History

An early Tamil tradition states that a king known variously as Ātontaicholan and Ādonda Chakravarthi brought a large number of agriculturists (now known as the Tuluva Vellalas) from the Tulu areas in order to reclaim forest lands for cultivation in Thondaimandalam. Sometimes this migration of Tuluva Vellalas is also assigned to later Chola times when Hoysala Ballalas of Karnataka had occupied portions of Kanchipuram and Trichy.

Demographics

Their original stronghold in Present-day Tamil nadu was Thiruvannamalai in North Arcot district, the town that served as the  capital of the Hoysala king Veera Ballala III in the 14th century.

Tuluva Vellalars are progressive and prosperous in the society. They are considerably advanced in the matter of education and the community was eagerly involved in business, Government and Non- governmental institutions.

The community commonly use Mudaliar and Udayar titles. However Naicker, Gounder, Reddy and Pillai titles are also present in some pockets.

Notable people
Vallal Pachayappa Mudaliar- a famous Dubashe of Madras and the founder of Pachayappa Educational Trust. 
V. L. Ethiraj, Barrister and philanthropist who founded Ethiraj College for Women.
 Sir Dr. C. Natesa Mudaliar, one of the founders of the Justice Party, politician, activist and philanthropist.
 Diwan Bahadur Sir Arcot Ramasamy Mudaliar, KCSI - Founder Chairman of UNESCO and the Diwan of Mysore.
P U Shanmugam - Former Tamil Nadu minister of Public Works Department.
V. M. Muralidharan, Chairman, Ethiraj College for Women

See also
Sangama dynasty
Arunachalesvara Temple

References 

Vellalar
Social groups of Tamil Nadu
Indian castes